Jean Tharaud (9 May 1877 – 8 April 1952) was a French writer.

Tharaud was born in Saint-Junien, Haute-Vienne. As a young man, he had been secretary to Maurice Barrès. He wrote books with his brother, Jérôme Tharaud, for over 50 years. In 1906, they won the Prix Goncourt for Dingley, l'illustre écrivain.

He was the eighteenth member elected to occupy seat 4 of the Académie française in 1946. His brother, Jérôme, had been seated at chair 31 in 1938.

He died in Paris in 1952.

References

External links

 

1877 births
1952 deaths
People from Haute-Vienne
19th-century French writers
20th-century French non-fiction writers
Members of the Académie Française
Officiers of the Légion d'honneur
Prix Goncourt winners
Burials at the Cemetery of Saint-Louis, Versailles
19th-century French male writers
20th-century French male writers